Synaptogyrin-1 is a protein that in humans is encoded by the SYNGR1 gene.

This gene encodes an integral membrane protein associated with presynaptic vesicles in neuronal cells. The exact function of this protein is unclear, but studies of a similar murine protein suggest that it functions in synaptic plasticity without being required for synaptic transmission. The gene product belongs to the synaptogyrin gene family. Three alternatively spliced variants encoding three different isoforms have been identified.

References

Further reading

Biology of bipolar disorder